Dwight Locke Wilbur (September 18, 1903 – March 9, 1997) was a medical doctor and president of the American Medical Association.  During his 1968-69 tenure, he was instrumental in convincing that organization to accept Medicare after many years of opposition.

Biography

Early life
Dwight Locke Wilbur was born on September 18, 1903. His father was Secretary of the Interior and AMA President Ray Lyman Wilbur. He graduated from Stanford University in 1923 and received his M.D. from the University of Pennsylvania in 1926.

Career
He was a founder of both the San Francisco Society of Internal Medicine and the California Society of Internal Medicine. He also served as president of the American Gastroenterological Association from 1954–55 and president of the American College of Physicians in 1959.  As a gastroenterologist and professor of medicine at Stanford starting in 1949, he published more than 200 scholarly articles.

Death
He died on March 9, 1997.

External links 

 Dwight Locke Wilbur: An Oral History, Stanford Historical Society Oral History Program, 1981

References

1903 births
1997 deaths
Stanford University alumni
Perelman School of Medicine at the University of Pennsylvania alumni
American gastroenterologists
Stanford University faculty
20th-century American physicians
Members of the National Academy of Medicine
Presidents of the American Medical Association